É, é (e-acute) is a letter of the Latin alphabet. In English, it is used for loanwords (such as French résumé), romanization (Japanese Pokémon) or occasionally as a pronunciation aid in poetry.

Languages may use é to indicate a certain sound (French), stress pattern (Spanish), length (Czech) or tone (Vietnamese), as well as to write loanwords or distinguish identical-sounding words (Dutch). Certain romanization systems such as pinyin (Standard Chinese) also use é for tone. Some languages use the letter only in specific contexts, such as in Indonesian dictionaries.

Languages

Afrikaans
In Afrikaans, é is used to differentiate meaning and word types. For example: in a sentence that repeats a word (that contains the vowel e) with different meaning or specificity, the e in one of the occurrences could be replaced with é to indicate the different meaning or specificity. Furthermore, é is respected when writing foreign words, mainly from French; and it is used to add visual stress on words in the same way English might use italics.

Catalan

Czech and Slovak
É is the 9th letter of the Czech alphabet and the 12th letter of the Slovak alphabet and represents .

Danish, Norwegian, and Swedish
In Danish, Norwegian, and Swedish, the letter "é" is used to indicate that a terminal syllable with the vowel e is stressed, and it is often used only when it changes the meaning. See Acute accent for a more detailed description. In addition, Danish uses é in some loanwords to represent /i/.

Dutch
Like in English, é is respected when writing foreign words, mainly from French.  It is also used to differentiate the article "een," equivalent to either "a" or "an" in English, and "één", the number one. It is also used to add visual stress on words in the same way English might use italics. In Dutch, some people use "hé" as a greeting, like "hey" or "hi".

Emilian-Romagnol
In Emilian, é is used to represent [e], e.g. récc [rekː] "rich". In Romagnol the same letter is used to represent [eː], e.g. lédar [ˈleːdar] "thieves".

English

In English, the e-acute (é)  has some uses, mostly in words that have been derived from French, such as née, résumé, fiancée, sauté and coupé and names such as Beyoncé, Breneé, JonBenét, and Théo. Pokémon, the media franchise owned by Japanese video game company and corporation Nintendo, uses [k]é to signify the proper pronunciation of the katakana ケ.

French

The letter é (pronounced ) contrasts with è (which is pronounced ) and is widely used in French.

Galician

Hungarian
É is the 10th letter of the Hungarian alphabet and represents .

Icelandic
É is the 7th letter of the Icelandic alphabet and represents .

Indonesian
Used in Indonesian dictionaries to denote , in contrast with E, e .

Irish
In Irish the acute accent (fada) marks a long vowel and so é is pronounced .

Italian
É is a variant of E carrying an acute accent; it represents an  carrying the tonic accent. It is used only if it is the last letter of the word except in dictionaries or when a different pronunciation may affect the meaning of a word: perché ("why"/"because") and pésca ("fishing"), to be compared with caffè ("coffee") and pèsca ("peach"), which have a grave accent.

Kashubian
É is the 8th letter of the Kashubian alphabet and represents . It also represents  in some dialects and represents  in area between Puck and Kartuzy.

Luxembourgish

Navajo

Occitan

Polish
In Polish, é was historically used for a vowel called e pochylone or e ścieśnione, sounded as [e], [ɨ] or [i] depending on the dialect. Since 1891, é is no longer used in standard Polish and is replaced by the simple e. It is, however, retained in editions of poetry where the rhyme suggests pronouncing it as i or y.

Portuguese
If the location of the stressed syllable is predictable, the acute accent is not used. É  contrasts with ê .

Russian
In Russian, é is used in the BS 2979:1958 system of Russian transliteration as the letter Э.

Scottish Gaelic
É was once used in Scottish Gaelic, but has now been largely superseded by "è". It can still be seen, but it is no longer used in the standard orthography.

Spanish
In Spanish, é is an accented letter and is pronounced just like "e" /e/. The accent indicates the stressed syllable in words with irregular stress, as in "éxtasis" or "bebé". See Diacritic and Acute accent for more details.

Standard Chinese/Mandarin (pinyin)

Sundanese
⟨É⟩ is used in Sundanese for the close-mid front unrounded vowel /e/ since 1975 with the publishing of Kamus Umum Basa Sunda (General Sundanese Dictionary), replacing the regular ⟨e⟩ used before to represent the vowel. ⟨E⟩ is now used for the mid central vowel /ə/, previously written as ⟨ê⟩.

Tuareg Berber

In Tuareg Berber, spoken in southern Algeria, southwestern Libya, northern Mali and northern Niger, é is one of the seven major vowels.

Vietnamese
In Vietnamese, the letter "é" indicates the rising tone. It can also be combined with "ê" to form "ế".

Welsh
In Welsh, word stress usually falls on the penultimate syllable, but one way of indicating stress on a final (short) vowel is through the use of the acute accent, often found on e in borrowed words: personél  "personnel", sigarét  "cigarette", ymbarél  "umbrella".

Yoruba
e with a Mí	High with a rising tone, depicted by an acute accent 
The pronunciation of words in Yorùbá language is tonal; where a different pitch conveys a different word meaning or grammatical distinction.

This means that pronouncing words in Yorùbá is based on what is called Àmì ohùn – Tone Marks. These marks are applied to the top of the vowel within each syllable of a word or phrase.

There are three types of tone marks namely:

Dò	Low with a falling tone, depicted by a grave accent
Re	Mid with a flat tone, depicted by an absence of any accent 
Mí	High with a rising tone, depicted by an acute accent 
Understanding the use of tone marks is key to properly reading, writing and speaking the Yorùbá language. This is because some words have similar spellings but at the addition of tone marks, these words could have very different meanings.

Character mappings

Key strokes 
 On US International and UK English keyboard layouts, users can type the acute accent letter "é" by typing .
 This method can also be applied to many other acute accented letters which do not appear on the standard US English keyboard layout.
 On macOS with French keyboard, users can use  then the  key which is readily available on such keyboards,
 On a standard Android, Windows Mobile, or iOS keyboard, users can hold the  key until special characters appear, slide to the é, and then release.
 On Unicode capable software, such as Firefox or Visual Studio Code, users can type a glyph using its Unicode code point. For example  for "É" (U+00C9).

See also
Acute accent

References

External links
Omniglot - writing systems & languages of the world
Hungarian language
Icelandic language
Kashubian language
Czech language
Slovak language
Uyghur language

Latin letters with diacritics
Polish letters with diacritics